The 1868 Truro by-election was held on 21 December 1868.  The by-election was held due to the incumbent Liberal MP, John Cranch Walker Vivian, becoming Lord Commissioner of the Treasury.  It was won by Vivian who was unopposed.

References

1868 elections in the United Kingdom
1868 in England
19th century in Cornwall
Politics of Truro
By-elections to the Parliament of the United Kingdom in Cornish constituencies
Unopposed ministerial by-elections to the Parliament of the United Kingdom in English constituencies
December 1868 events